Trichorthosia was a genus of moths of the family Noctuidae, it is now considered a synonym of Hypotrix.

Former species
 Trichorthosia aselenograpta Dyar, 1916
 Trichorthosia cirphidia (Draudt, 1924)
 Trichorthosia clarcana Dyar, 1916
 Trichorthosia diapera (Hampson, 1913)
 Trichorthosia diplogramma (Schaus, 1903)
 Trichorthosia duplicilinea (Dognin, 1908)
 Trichorthosia euryte (Druce, 1898)
 Trichorthosia ferricola (Smith, 1903)
 Trichorthosia niveilinea (Schaus, 1894)
 Trichorthosia parallela Grote, 1883
 Trichorthosia tristis is now Anhypotrix tristis (Barnes & McDunnough, 1910)
 Trichorthosia umbrifer (Dyar, 1916)

References
Natural History Museum Lepidoptera genus database
Trichorthosia at funet

Hadeninae